Bozgush (also Romanized as Bozgūsh) is a village in Rahal Rural District, in the Central District of Khoy County, West Azerbaijan Province, Iran. At the 2006 census, its population was 177, in 41 families.

References 

Populated places in Khoy County